Jacques Borel (17 December 1925 in Paris – 25 September 2002) was a French author best known for his 1965 novel L'Adoration (translated into English as The Bond), which won the Prix Goncourt.

Bibliography
 L'Adoration (1965)
 Tata ou De l'Education (1967)
 Le Retour (1970)
 La Dépossession - Journal de Ligenère (1973)
 Commentaires (1974)
 Un Voyage ordinaire (1975)
 Histoire de mes vieux habits (1979)
 Poésie et nostalgie (1979)
 Petite histoire de mes rêves (1981)
 L'enfant voyeur (1987)
 L'Attente. La Clôture (1987)
 Sur les murs du temps (1989)
 Commémorations (1990)
 Le Déferlement (1993)
 Le chocolat est-il une drogue? (1994)
 Journal de la mémoire (1994)
 Propos sur l'autobiographie (1994)
 L'Aveu différé (1997)
 L'Effacement (1998)
 Sur les poètes (1998)
 La Mort de Maximilien Lepage, acteur (2000)
 Ombres et dieux (2001)
 Rue de l'exil (2002)

References

1925 births
2002 deaths
Writers from Paris
20th-century French novelists
20th-century French male writers
Prix Goncourt winners
French male novelists